Magley is an unincorporated community in Preble Township, Adams County, in the U.S. state of Indiana.

History
A post office was established at Magley in 1883, and remained in operation until it was discontinued in 1927. The community was named for the first postmaster, Jacob J. Magley.

Geography

References

Unincorporated communities in Adams County, Indiana
Unincorporated communities in Indiana
Populated places established in 1883